Glen Fitzpatrick (born 26 January 1981 in Dublin) is an Irish former football player who is the current Director of Football at Broadford Rovers in the Leinster Senior League (association football).

A former youth international he made his League of Ireland debut for UCD against Shamrock Rovers on 16 October 1998.

Before he joined Pats he played for Broadford Rovers, Cherry Orchard, UCD, Athlone Town, Glenavon, Shamrock Rovers, Shelbourne and Drogheda United. He scored on his Glenavon debut in February 2003.

While at Rovers he scored in European competition when Odra Wodzislaw were beaten in the UEFA Intertoto Cup in June 2003  In total he represented Rovers 4 times in Europe.

While with Shelbourne he scored in the UEFA Champions League qualifiers and the Uefa Cup first round in 2004. His most famous game being when introduced as a substitute and scoring 2 goals to earn a late 2-2 come from behind draw against Lille of France at Lansdowne Road.

Fitzpatrick signed for St. Patrick's Athletic in July 2007. He collapsed in a pre match warm up in April 2009.

He signed again for Drogheda United in January 2010.

Honours
League of Ireland: 2
 Shelbourne - 2004
 Drogheda United 2007
Setanta Sports Cup: 2
 Drogheda United – 2006, 2007
SRFC Player of the Year:
 Shamrock Rovers - 2003

References

External links 
 https://web.archive.org/web/20080505030426/http://www.stpatsfc.com/player.php?playerid=61

1981 births
Living people
Association footballers from County Dublin
Republic of Ireland association footballers
Republic of Ireland youth international footballers
League of Ireland players
University College Dublin A.F.C. players
Athlone Town A.F.C. players
Shamrock Rovers F.C. players
Glenavon F.C. players
Shelbourne F.C. players
Drogheda United F.C. players
St Patrick's Athletic F.C. players
NIFL Premiership players
Association football forwards
Cherry Orchard F.C. players
Leinster Senior League (association football) managers
Republic of Ireland football managers